= George H. Flavelle =

American painter

George H. Flavelle (1868–1945) was an American artist who was born in 1868 in Philadelphia, Pennsylvania. He is best known for his watercolor paintings of landscapes, seascapes, woodland interiors, cottages, and windmills. He studied art at the Spring Garden School and the Pennsylvania Watercolor School, and also worked as a glass and china decorator. He died in 1945 in Lynbrook, Long Island, New York.
